Kaylani Juanita McCard, professionally known as Kaylani Juanita, is an illustrator. Her work focuses on activism, empowerment of people of color, and LGBTQ+ people. Her work has appeared in publications through Chronicle Books, Cicada Magazine, and Lee & Low Books. Her first book illustrated, Ta-Da! by Kathy Ellen Davis, was released by Chronicle Books and nominated for an Young Readers award via the 38th Annual Northern California Book Awards. In 2018, ELLE Magazine featured her work and interviewed her at length in context of her memorial illustrations based on the murder of Nia Wilson, a black woman who was fatally stabbed in a suspected hate crime while exiting a BART train. In 2017, she illustrated "9 Books for Woke Kids," an article by Guinevere de la Mare.

Education
Juanita attended B. Gale Wilson Elementary School in Solano County's Fairfield-Suisun Unified School District as well as Rodriguez High School. While attending Rodriguez, Juanita spent a summer studying at CalArts. She then attended Solano College before transferring to California College of the Arts. She earned her BFA in Illustration from California College of the Arts. As of 2019, she is working on a Master's in Design at the University of California, Davis.

Personal life
Juanita is based in Fairfield, CA and identifies as a mixed-race femme queer person.

Awards and honors

When Aiden Became A Brother 
Kaylani Jaunita and Kyle Lukoff  published When Aiden Became a Brother in 2019. In 2020, the book was awarded the Stonewall Children’s and Young Adult Literature Award, landed a top spot on the American Library Association Rainbow List, and was named a Charlotte Huck Honor Book.

Bibliography
A House for Every Bird by Megan Maynor, illustrated by Kaylani Juanita, (2021)
 When Aidan Became a Brother by Kyle Lukoff, illustrated by Kaylani Juanita (2019)
 Watch Us Rise by Reneé Watson & Ellen Hagan, illustrated by Kaylani Juanita (2019)
 Ta-Da! by Kathy Ellen Davis, illustrated by Kaylani Juanita (2018)
 Magnificent Homespun Brown by Samara Cole Doyon, illustrated by Kaylani Juanita (2020)

Podcasts
The Creativity Habit

References

American children's book illustrators
American LGBT artists
American women illustrators
Year of birth missing (living people)
Queer women
Living people
21st-century American women